San Bernardino is a village in Texcoco, State of Mexico, Mexico.

References

Populated places in the State of Mexico
Texcoco, State of Mexico